Kinga Zbylut, née Mitoraj (born 10 April 1995 in Zakopane) is a Polish biathlete. She competed at the  2022 Winter Olympics, in Women's individual Biathlon.

She competed at the 2012 Winter Youth Olympics.

References

External links 
 Kinga Zbylut of Team Poland skis during the third leg of the Women's Biathlon 4x6km Relay Photo by Maja Hitij,  February 16, 2022

1995 births
Biathletes at the 2022 Winter Olympics
Polish female biathletes
Olympic biathletes of Poland
Living people
Biathletes at the 2012 Winter Youth Olympics
Sportspeople from Zakopane